The 1941 National Challenge Cup was the 28th edition of the United States Football Association's annual open cup. Today, the tournament is known as the Lamar Hunt U.S. Open Cup. Teams from the American Soccer League II competed in the tournament, based on qualification methods in their base region.

Pawtucket F.C. from Pawtucket, Rhode Island won the tournament for first time defeating, Detroit Chrysler of Detroit, Michigan in the process.

External links
 1941 National Challenge Cup – TheCup.us

Lamar Hunt U.S. Open Cup
U.S. Open Cup